Anunaya Anoop better known by her stage name Meenakshi Anoop, is an Indian actress who works primarily in the Malayalam film industry. She is best known for her role as Fathima (Pathu/Pathumma) in the 2015 comedy film Amar Akbar Anthony and Nandinikkutty (Nandini) in the 2016 crime thriller Oppam.

Early life 
Meenakshi was born to Anoop R. Paduva, a computer accountant and Remya. She has completed her high school education from NSS Higher Secondary School, Kidangoor and is pursuing higher secondary studies at MGM NSS HSS , Lakkattoor. She was 9A+ holder at SSLC 10TH Exams.

Career 

Meenakshi started her acting career with a short film Madhura Nombaram directed by Akhil S Kiran.

She made her film debut in Arun Kumar Aravind's 1 by Two (2014), though her scenes were not included in the film. She then went on to act in 1000: Oru Note Paranja Katha, Jamna Pyari, and Aana Mayil Ottakam, all of which released in 2015. She made her breakthrough portraying Fathima (Pathu/Pathumma) in Amar Akbar Anthony (2015). International Business Times stated about her performance, "The child artist has been receiving amazing responses from the audience and is undoubtedly loved by everyone for her innocent and natural acting." She also received the Asianet Film Award for Best Child Artist for her performance.

She acted in the Priyadarsan movie Oppam, as Nandhini kutty and signed on to act in upcoming films such as Zacharia Pothen Jeevichirippundu and Kanbathu Poi, the latter of which is a Tamil film.

Her film debut in languages other than Malayalam include , Kavacha in Kannada, The Body in Hindi and "Kanbathu Poi" in Tamil

Filmography
All films are in Malayalam, unless otherwise noted.

Television

References

External links 
 

Actresses from Kottayam
Living people
Actresses in Malayalam cinema
Indian film actresses
21st-century Indian child actresses
Actresses in Kannada cinema
Child actresses in Malayalam cinema
2000s births